Nico Constantine is an American music director, producer, and guitarist, known for his work with Lady Gaga, Biters, Program the Dead, Comes with the Fall, and Madfly. He is the founder of Institution Records.

Biography

Madfly and Comes with the Fall

In 1996, Constantine joined Madfly in Atlanta, Georgia, along with singer-guitarist William DuVall, drummer Bevan Davies, and bassist Jeffery Blount. In 1998, Joan Jett signed Madfly to Blackheart/Mercury Records. After releasing White Hot in the Black, the band left Blackheart/Mercury, and reformed as Comes with the Fall in 1999, with Adam Stanger replacing Jeffery Blount on bass.

Comes with the Fall recorded their self-titled album in Atlanta, a year later, before relocating to Los Angeles, California, catching the attention of Alice in Chains guitarist Jerry Cantrell. Their self-titled album was released the same year through DuVall's DVL Records.

Constantine amicably parted ways with Comes with the Fall during the first leg of the Degradation Trip tour, however, some of his writing would appear on their later studio releases, The Year Is One, The Reckoning and Beyond the Last Light. DuVall thanked Constantine along with the rest of the founding members of Comes with the Fall within the liner notes of Alice in Chains' 2009 album Black Gives Way to Blue.

Program the Dead
After leaving Comes with the Fall, Constantine went on to form the band Program the Dead, along with vocalist Matt Koruba, drummer Dave Murga, and bassist Johnny McClay (later replaced by Tom Kafafian). Program the Dead was signed to Universal Motown by Andrew Kronfeld six months after forming. The band toured extensively throughout the United States, Canada and the UK sharing the stage with such bands as HIM, Mindless Self Indulgence, and the Bloodhound Gang.

Lady Gaga
In 2006, Constantine played guitar on Lady Gaga's planned album release for Island Def Jam. In 2009, he served as Lady Gaga's music director and lead guitarist, assembling her first live band for her World Tour 2009 of the Fame Ball throughout Europe, Asia, Australia, New Zealand, Israel and the United States. He also served as Gaga's music director and guitarist for her performances on Dancing with the Stars, the BBC Glastonbury Concert, the Isle of MTV Malta Special, Australia's Live at the Chapel, and many European TV specials.

Institution Records and Production career 
In 2013, Constantine founded Institution Records, working with bands such as Biters, Starbenders, Rosegarden Funeral Party, and Brooklynn.

Discography

References

External links

American rock guitarists
American male guitarists
Comes with the Fall members
Madfly members
Year of birth missing (living people)
Living people